Amphipyra livida is a moth in the family Noctuidae. It is found in central and southern Europe, although strays are known from further north. It is also known from Anatolia to Korea, China and Japan.

The wingspan is 39–45 mm. Adults are mainly on wing from August to October.

The larvae feed on various low-growing plants, such as Taraxacum and Hieracium species. Larvae can be found from April to July. The species overwinters as an egg.

Subspecies
Amphipyra livida livida
Amphipyra livida corvina (Japan)

References

External links

 Fauna Europaea
 Lepiforum.de
 schmetterlinge-deutschlands.de

Amphipyrinae
Moths of Asia
Moths of Europe
Moths described in 1775
Taxa named by Michael Denis
Taxa named by Ignaz Schiffermüller